The 2010–11 Chicago Blackhawks season was the 85th season for the National Hockey League franchise that was established on September 25, 1926. The team was nicknamed the "Hangover 'Hawks" for having to recover from winning the franchise's first Stanley Cup in 49 years while adapting to the loss of several players from that team due to salary cap restrictions.

The Blackhawks succumbed to the Presidents' Trophy-winning Vancouver Canucks in seven games in the first round of the Stanley Cup Playoffs.

Off-season
Under pressure to fit the team's player salaries under the salary cap for the 2010–11 season, the team began making trades shortly after winning the Stanley Cup. On June 24, the club traded Dustin Byfuglien, Ben Eager, Brent Sopel and Akim Aliu to the Atlanta Thrashers for Marty Reasoner, Joey Crabb, Jeremy Morin, a first-round pick (#24 overall) in 2010 and a second-round pick (#54 overall) in 2010. Later that same day, restricted free agent Colin Fraser was traded to the Edmonton Oilers for a sixth-round pick in 2010.
On June 30, the Toronto Maple Leafs traded for right winger Kris Versteeg from Chicago in a five-player trade. The Maple Leafs gave up forwards Viktor Stalberg, Chris DiDomenico and Philippe Paradis. Toronto also acquired the rights to 21-year-old left winger Bill Sweatt, who was a second-round pick in 2007.
On July 1, the Blackhawks traded Andrew Ladd to the Atlanta Thrashers for Ivan Vishnevskiy and a second-round draft pick in 2011. On July 9, Niklas Hjalmarsson was signed to an offer sheet by the San Jose Sharks, though the Blackhawks matched the offer on July 12, thereby retaining his services and forgoing compensation from the Sharks for signing a restricted free agent. This signing again put Chicago against the salary cap wall, and as a result forced the club to forego resigning goaltender Antti Niemi, who had filed for arbitration.

Regular season 
Goaltender Marty Turco made his Blackhawks debut on October 7, a 4–3 overtime loss against the Colorado Avalanche. His first Blackhawks win came on October 15, a 5–2 victory over the Columbus Blue Jackets. Defenseman Nick Leddy made his NHL debut on October 7, and he scored his first NHL goal on October 11. Evan Brophey made his NHL debut on October 23. Patrick Sharp had a record of 13 shots on goal, the highest shot total in a single game in Blackhawks history. Marian Hossa was named the NHL's Second Star of the Week for the week ending on October 18, and Duncan Keith was named Third Star of the Week for the week ending on November 1.

Division standings

Conference standings

Schedule and results

Legend:

Pre-season

Regular season

Playoffs
The Blackhawks returned to the playoffs for the third straight season and were defending their championship of the Stanley Cup as the 8th seed. The Blackhawks played the Canucks for the third straight postseason. In the previous two rounds, the Blackhawks defeated the Canucks twice, four games to two. The Blackhawks were down three games to none, but managed to tie up the series facing elimination. The Blackhawks became just the seventh team in NHL history to come back to tie an 0–3 deficit in the playoffs. The Blackhawks lost in overtime in game seven to an Alex Burrows goal for a 2–1 loss.

Player statistics

Skaters

Goaltenders
Note: GP = Games played; Min = Minutes played; W = Wins; L = Losses; OT = Overtime losses; GA = Goals against; GAA= Goals against average; SA= Shots against; SV= Saves; Sv% = Save percentage; SO= Shutouts

†Denotes player spent time with another team before joining Blackhawks. Stats reflect time with the Blackhawks only.
‡Traded or released mid-season
Bold/italics denotes franchise record

Detailed records

Awards and records

Awards

Milestones

Transactions
The Blackhawks have been involved in the following transactions during the 2010–11 season.

Trades

Notes

Free agents acquired

Free agents lost

Claimed via waivers

Lost via waivers

Player signings

Draft picks 
The 2010 NHL Entry Draft was at Staples Center in Los Angeles, California, on June 25 and 26, 2010. The Blackhawks picked 30th in each round. The Blackhawks were active in trading, moving up from 30th in the draft to 24th to select Kevin Hayes. Through other trades, the Blackhawks picked up three selections in the second round, and had ten selections overall in the draft.

See also 
 2010–11 NHL season

References

External links
2010–11 Chicago Blackhawks season Official Site
2010–11 Chicago Blackhawks season at ESPN
2010–11 Chicago Blackhawks season at Hockey Reference
2010–11 Chicago Blackhawks season at Chicago Tribune

Chicago Blackhawks seasons
Chicago Blackhawks season, 2010-11
Chicago
Chic
Chic